The fourth season of Workaholics premiered on Comedy Central at 10/9c on January 22 and concluded on April 16, 2014 with a total of 13 episodes.

Cast

Main

Starring
Blake Anderson as Blake Henderson
Adam DeVine as Adam DeMamp
Anders Holm as Anders "Ders" Holmvik

Also starring
Jillian Bell as Jillian Belk
Erik Griffin as Montez Walker
Maribeth Monroe as Alice Murphy

Recurring
Kyle Newacheck as Karl Hevachek
Bill Stevenson as Bill

Guest
Alex Borstein as Colleen Walker
Erinn Hayes as Miss BS
Cerina Vincent as Laura
Lorenzo Lamas as Rick Messina
Katherine McNamara as Haley
Marc Evan Jackson as Dr. Gerald Landes
Leslie Jones as Lynette
Philip 'Hot Sauce' Champion from AND1 as George 
Kevin Heffernan as Officer Don Burton

Production
On January 6, 2013, Comedy Central renewed Workaholics for a 13-episode fourth and fifth season respectively.

Episodes

Notes

References

External links
 
 

2014 American television seasons